Om Mehta (20 February 1927 – 12 February 1995) was the Minister of State for Home, Personnel and Parliamentary Affairs (Independent Charge) in Indira Gandhi's government in 1976. He was a powerful veteran of the Indian Congress during Indira Gandhi's time . He was a politician from Jammu, first with National Conference, and later with Congress.

Om Mehta was born on 20 February 1927 in Kishtwar Town. He completed his education at Prince of Wales College (now Gandhi Memorial Science College) in Jammu. In 1947 he joined the National Conference. He was also the chairman of the Chamber of Commerce Co-operative Society Kishtwar and established a building for it, which is situated near Tehsildar's office.

He was elected as legislative member of council in 1957 as well as in 1959. He was the first member to bring upon situations held in Kishtwar in the council, which resulted in many job opportunities for the people of Kishtwar. In 1962, he became the Director General of J&K Corporative Bank. He was also the working committee member of Bharat Sewak Sangh, Panchayti Raj Committee, Red Industries Board and Constitution Club New Delhi.

In 1964, he joined Indian National Congress and in the same year, he became the Member of Parliament. He was brought to the Centre and to the Rajya Sabha to strengthen the Young Turk base before the 1969 congress split. In parliament he was the member of public accounts committee from 1966 to 1968. One of the few leaders from Jammu and Kashmir, he was first given minor portfolios, parliamentary secretaries, Union Minister of Communication, Works and Housing and then finally, immediately before "The Emergency," he became Minister of State for Home Affairs. In 1970, he was given the ministerial rank in the union and in 1971 he became minister of aviation and transport where as in 1973 Department of Development was added to his ministry. During his ministerial tenure, he was given the opportunity to become India's most honored minister. He was the de facto Home Minister from 1974 to 1977.

His contribution for the development of District Doda is fabulous. Dul hasti hydroelectric plant, Batote Kishtwar national highway, Kishtwar Manali border road, Kishtwar water supply, and Bhadarwah Chamba road are few examples of his many developmental works that were not possible without him being in the assembly. Om Mehta is one among the very few personalities of Kishtwar who served their entire life in serving and revolutionizing Kishtwar that can never be forgotten by Kishtwari people.

References

External links
 (Inactive as of 14 April 2008)
 Biography of Om Mehta
 

1927 births
1995 deaths
Place of birth missing
People from Kishtwar district
People of the Emergency (India)
Members of the Jammu and Kashmir Legislative Council
Rajya Sabha members from Jammu and Kashmir
Indian National Congress politicians
Jammu & Kashmir National Conference politicians